This is a partial list of notable persons who have or had ties to Columbia University.

Politics, military and law

Business

Religion and ministry

See also: Notable alumni of Columbia College of Columbia University (Religious figures) for separate listing of more than 10 religious figures

Architecture, arts and literature

See also: Notable alumni of Columbia Graduate School of Architecture, Planning and Preservation, Columbia College of Columbia University (Artists and architects; and Writers) and Columbia Law School (Arts and Letters) for separate listing of more than 90 architects, artists, and writers

Performing arts

See also: Notable alumni of Columbia College of Columbia University (Actors; Musicians, Composers, Lyricists; Playwrights, Screenwriters, and Directors) and Columbia University School of the Arts

Academy awards

Actors, directors, writers, composers, others

Journalism
See also: Notable alumni of Columbia Graduate School of Journalism, Columbia College of Columbia University (Journalism and media figures; and Publishers), and Columbia Law School (Journalists) for separate listing of more than 175 journalists, media figures, and publishers

National Book Awards

Pulitzer prize winners

MacArthur Fellows
The following alumni are fellows of the MacArthur Fellows Program (known as the "genius grant") from the John D. and Catherine T. MacArthur Foundation. As this is an interdisciplinary award, fellows are listed here as well as in their fields of accomplishment.

National Medal of Science

National Medal of Technology
Jan Drewes Achenbach (post-doc research) – mechanical engineer; 2003 National Medal of Technology; ASME Medal
Edwards Deming (faculty 1988–93) – statistician; 1987 National Medal of Technology 
Walter Lincoln Hawkins (postgraduate research) – chemical engineer, chemist; 1992 National Medal of Technology; first African-American member, National Academy of Engineering; National Inventors Hall of Fame
Robert Ledley (B.S., M.S. 1950) – professor of physiology and biophysics; 1997 National Medal of Technology; National Inventors Hall of Fame; pioneered use of electronic digital computers in biology and medicine; research lead to invention of whole-body CT scanner;
Arun Netravali (faculty) – computer engineer; 2001 National Medal of Technology; 1991 IEEE Alexander Graham Bell Medal; President of Bell Laboratories (1999–2001) and former Chief Scientist for Lucent Technologies

Science, technology, engineering, mathematics

See also: Notable alumni of Columbia College of Columbia University (Scientists and inventors) for additional listing of more than 28 scientists and inventors, Columbia School of Engineering and Applied Science for additional listing of more than 55 scientists, engineers, computer scientists and inventors, and Columbia University College of Physicians and Surgeons for  additional listing of more than 100 physicians

Astronauts and aviators

Kenneth D. Bowersox (M.S. 1979)
Kevin P. Chilton (M.S. 1977)
Amelia Earhart (attended one semester, 1920)
William G. Gregory (M.S. 1980)
Gregory H. Johnson (M.S. 1985)
Michael J. Massimino (B.S. 1984)
Story Musgrave (M.D. 1964)
Eugene H. Trinh (B.S. 1972)

Academia: Presidents, chancellors, founders

Academia: Theorists
See also: above at Nobel Laureates (Alumni) for separate listing of more than 43 academics and theorists, Notable alumni at Columbia College of Columbia University (Academicians), Columbia Law School (Academia: University presidents and Legal Academia), and Columbia Graduate School of Arts and Sciences (Economists-Natural Scientists, Social Scientists) for separate listing of more than 163 academics and theorists

Sports

Activists
See also: notable alumni of Columbia Law School (Activism) and Columbia College (Miscellaneous) for a separate listing of more than 50 activists

Fictional characters

See also

References

External links
Nobel Prize Winners associated with Columbia University
Nobel Prize Winners in Physics associated with Columbia University
Columbians Ahead of Their Time – list of notable Columbians created by Columbia University for its 250th anniversary
After Columbia "Notable Alumni & Former Students," published by the Columbia University Office of Admissions

 
Columbia University alumni and attendees
Alumni